Jeena Hai Toh Thok Daal is a 2012 Indian Hindi-language action crime film directed by Manish Vatsalya, starring Ravi Kishen, Yashpal Sharma, Rahul Kumar, Manish Vatsalya and Hazel Crowney. The movie's storyline is a hard hitting gangster movie which shows horrid realities of the underworld crime as well as the changing times of Bihar state. The film was released on 14 September 2012 and was written off as a box office disaster in the very first week.

Cast
Ravi Kishen as Chandrabhan
Yashpal Sharma as Mahkoo
Rahul Kumar as Bitwa.
 Manish Vatsalya as Atka 
Hazel Crowney as Shrishti
Sharat Saxena as Rana
Murli Sharma as Hanumant Singh
Ashwini Kalsekar as I. G.

Controversy
The controversial subject matter of Jeena Hai Toh Thok Daal, together with the song from it titled "Mooh Mein Le", provoked a reaction from Shiv Sena.

Soundtrack

Critical reception
Overall the movie received negative reviews and was a box office disaster  Mid-Day rated it as 0.5, while The Times of India and ''Daily Bhaskar also did the same.

References

Io rahul kumar

External links
 

2010s Hindi-language films
Indian crime films
2012 films
Crime in Bihar
Films set in Bihar
2012 directorial debut films
2012 crime films